In Brazil, a sarará ( or ) is a multiracial person, being a particular kind of mulato or juçara (a tri-racial pardo with Amerindian features), with perceivable Black African facial features, light complexion and fair but curly hair, called cabelo crespo, or fair but Afro-like frizzly hair, called carapinha, cabelo encarapinhado or cabelo pixaim. In the 1998 IBGE PME (Monthly Employment Survey), 0.04% of respondents identified, in an inquiry on race/colour, as "sarará".

While the emphasis on fair skin in Brazil is not as visible as in other post-colonial societies, with many preferring and advocating the moreno or olive skin beauty type, European facial features and hair texture are a beauty standard in Brazil, and many people of diverse backgrounds use flat irons and chemical hair treatments to pass their hair as straight or wavy. In a society that divides between "white" and "black", sararás will be placed together with the Brown-skinned pardos as non-whites, despite their fair complexion and hair.

Background
It is known that the genes responsible for blondism i.e. blonde hair (that probably firstly appeared around the Baltic Sea) and rutilism i.e. red hair (that probably firstly appeared in Africa and then spread to other continents, but is only present in significant numbers in Western Eurasian populations and their descendants) are recessive, so that a person with full Amerindian or sub-Saharan African ancestry, or a mixing between the two, is by far very unlikely to have red-haired or blond-haired offspring, no matter how fair the complexion of her or his Caucasian or multiracial sexual partner or spouse.

The genes responsible for brown hair are also extremely rare among Indigenous peoples of the Americas and Black Africans, but not as uncommon. The most common hair colour in Brazil is brown. Natural blond and red hair are especially found in the South where 78% of the population has European phenotype, home to large German-Austrian (Santa Catarina), Dutch, Norwegian, Northern Italian, and Slavic (Paraná) populations, and the Southeast region that has the largest absolute numbers of Whites. About 21% of Brazilians descend from the country's indigenous peoples and Portuguese settlers, as well as Dutch, French and Spanish colonial settlers, including Crypto-Jews or Anusim and Gypsies or Roma people, while 7% to 25% also have African slave ancestors. Since the arrival of the Portuguese in 1500, considerable miscegenation between these groups has taken place, in all regions of the country (with European ancestry being dominant nationwide according to the vast majority of all autosomal studies undertaken covering the entire population, accounting for between 65% to 77%).

European colonization and immigration waves
Most Portuguese colonists as well as most Portuguese immigrants to Brazil came from Northern Portugal, which are its blondest regions. Colonial Brazil was also home to some Dutch invaders who were successful at staying in Brazil even after their territorial loss. The second most common non-Portuguese European group in Colonial Brazil were the French, with its cultural influence, represented by things such as the French artistic mission, that can be seen until this day, with the greater number of loanwords into Brazilian Portuguese coming from the French language.

The earliest Central European mass immigration started by the 1830s, and increased much in part due to the slavery crisis. Together with the Germans and the Swiss, came the early Italians. While the total Italian immigration to Brazil was evenly distributed between South, Center and North, most early Italian colonists came from the Northern provinces who had land borders with other European countries. Other immigration waves, from all regions of Europe, as well the Levantine Arabs and East Asians, came thereafter.

A colonial Spanish genetic contribution is present in the southernmost state of Rio Grande do Sul, with some estimates placing it almost as high as the Portuguese one, and up to 15 million people nowadays are descendants of post-independence Spanish immigration waves. As with those descended from the Portuguese, most Brazilians of Spanish heritage trace it to the blondest region of Spain, Galicia.

Degree of European descent of non-white Brazilians
Genetic research on ancestry of Brazilians of different races has extensively shown that, regardless of skin colour, Brazilians generally have European, African and Amerindian ancestors.

According to a genetic study about Brazilians, on the paternal side, 98% of the White Brazilian Y chromosome comes from a European male ancestor, only 2% from an African ancestor, and there is a complete absence of Amerindian contributions. On the maternal side, 39% have a European Mitochondrial DNA, 33% Amerindian and 28% African MtDNA. This analysis only shows a small fraction of a person's ancestry (the Y Chromosome comes from a single male ancestor and the mtDNA from a single female ancestor, while the contributions of the many other ancestors is not specified), but it shows that miscegenation in Brazil was directional, between Portuguese males and African and Amerindian females.

Analyzing Black Brazilians' Y chromosome, which comes from male ancestors through the paternal line, it was concluded that half (50%) of the Black Brazilian population has at least one male ancestor who came from Europe, 48% has at least one male ancestor who came from Africa and 1.6% has at least one male ancestor who was Amerindian. Analyzing their mitochondrial DNA, that comes from female ancestors though maternal line, 85% of them have at least a female ancestor who came from Africa, 12.5% have at least a female ancestor who was Native Brazilian and only 2.5% have at least a female ancestor who came from Europe.

As for the complete genetic ancestry of Brazilians, research has shown that it is predominantly European, even among non-white Brazilians. According to another study (autosomal DNA) conducted on a school in the poor periphery of Rio de Janeiro the pardos there were found to be on average over 80% European, and the "whites" (who thought of themselves as "very mixed") were found out to carry very little Amerindian and/or African admixtures. "The results of the tests of genomic ancestry are quite different from the self made estimates of European ancestry", say the researchers. In general, the test results showed that European ancestry is far more important than the students thought it would be. The pardos for example thought of themselves as 1/3 European, 1/3 African and 1/3 Amerindian before the tests, and yet their ancestry was determined to be at over 80% European.

Another autosomal DNA study, from 2010, also focused on the autosomal contribution (which is about the sum of the ancestors of each individual, the overall picture), found out that almost 80% of the Brazilian genes are of European origin in all regions except in the South where it stands for 90% of them (regardless of census' racial classification). "Ancestry informative SNPs can be useful to estimate individual and population biogeographical ancestry. Brazilian population is characterized by a genetic background of three parental populations (European, African, and Brazilian Native Amerindians) with a wide degree and diverse patterns of admixture. In this work we analyzed the information content of 28 ancestry-informative SNPs into multiplexed panels using three parental population sources (African, Amerindian, and European) to infer the genetic admixture in an urban sample of the five Brazilian geopolitical regions. The SNPs assigned apart the parental populations from each other and thus can be applied for ancestry estimation in a three hybrid admixed population. Data was used to infer genetic ancestry in Brazilians with an admixture model. Pairwise estimates of F(st) among the five Brazilian geopolitical regions suggested little genetic differentiation only between the South and the remaining regions. Estimates of ancestry results are consistent with the heterogeneous genetic profile of Brazilian population, with a major contribution of European ancestry (0.771) followed by African (0.143) and Amerindian contributions (0.085). The described multiplexed SNP panels can be useful tool for bioanthropological studies but it can be mainly valuable to control for spurious results in genetic association studies in admixed populations." The samples came from free of charge paternity test takers, thus as the researchers made it explicit: "the paternity tests were free of charge, the population samples involved people of variable socioeconomic strata, although likely to be leaning slightly towards the ‘‘pardo’’ group".

According to another different study (also autosomal DNA from 2009), European ancestry predominates in the Brazilian population. The Brazilians as a whole, from all regions, and of all complexions, would lie more closely to the European group than to the African populations or to the mestizos from Mexico, from the genetical point of view. This shows that the genotypes of individuals in a miscigenated population does not necessarily match their phenotype.

Final demographic picture
In the 19th and 20th century Brazilian culture has promoted racial integration and miscegenation. Intermixing is common between Brazilians who come from more recent immigrant waves and those descendant of older, or different, immigrant communities. Interracial marriages comprised 22.6% of all marriages in 2000. There has never been a widespread taboo against racial or ethnic mixing in any Brazilian ethnic community, with the notable exceptions of German and latter Japanese immigrants, who nevertheless fully integrated in the second halves of the 19th and 20th centuries respectively. In Brazilian culture, ethnic preservation taboos are regarded as plain fear of outsiders – in part inherited from nationalism defining a single Brazilian cultural identity, with no space for any other.

Since the offspring of a couple with some genetic differences will have a random combination of their genotypes, their appearance, that depends on a smaller number of elements from this gene pool, will also be of a random combination. As a result of the continuing process of intermixing, any sort of phenotype between those stereotypically European, African or Amerindian will show up, and even if many of the genes related to European-like features are recessive, they are likely to evenly manifest in the Brazilian population, just being more common in the regions where European immigration was greater.

Footnotes

Multiracial affairs in Brazil
Ethnic groups in Brazil
African–Native American relations